"Fixin to Thrill" is an electropop/new wave song performed by Canadian band Dragonette. The song was written and produced by Dragonette for their second album Fixin to Thrill (2009). It was released as the album's lead single in May 2009.

Music video
The video features lead singer Martina Sorbara as some sort of golem created by a group of children. Once brought to life, the children dance with and customize their creation in a suburban home. The video concludes with the children's parents attempting to destroy Sorbara unsuccessfully. The fourth wall is frequently broken during the duration of the video by integrating behind the scenes turmoil into the main story.

Track listing

Digital Remix EP

(Released )

References

2009 singles
2009 songs
Dragonette songs
Songs written by Martina Sorbara
Songs written by Dan Kurtz